Damien Pichereau (born 28 January 1988) is a French politician representing La République En Marche! He was elected to the French National Assembly on 18 June 2017, representing the 1st constituency of the department of Sarthe. He is not seeking re-election at the 2022 French legislative election.

See also
 2017 French legislative election

References

1988 births
Living people
Deputies of the 15th National Assembly of the French Fifth Republic
La République En Marche! politicians
Place of birth missing (living people)

21st-century French politicians